Li3 or LI3 may refer to:

 Li3 (software), a full-stack web framework for producing web applications
 Lithium (3Li), an isotope of oxygen, a chemical element with symbol Li and atomic number 3
 Lithium-3 (Li-3 or 3Li), a hypothetical isotope of lithium with no neutrons
 "Trilithium", a fictional chemical compound in Star Trek
 "Less interesting three" (LI3), nickname for Aerosmith members Tom Hamilton, Joey Kramer, and Brad Whitford (those not in the "Toxic Twins")

See also 
 LIE (disambiguation)